Iqra Khalid  (born November 20, 1985) is a Pakistani Asian-Canadian politician who was elected to represent the riding of Mississauga—Erin Mills in the House of Commons of Canada in the 2015 federal election.

Early life and education
Khalid was born in Pakistan. In 1993 her family moved to England while her father completed his PhD. In 1998 her family immigrated to Canada, where her parents started a small family business in Mississauga. Iqra and her three brothers helped at this store while they attended school. Khalid attended York University, where she graduated with a degree in criminology and professional writing in 2007. As a student she served as the media ambassador for the York University Student Alumni Program.

Following her graduation she began working at an immigration firm. She then went on to pursue a Juris Doctor degree at Western Michigan University Cooley Law School. She completed the three-year program in only two. She wrote her final thesis on a comparative analysis of the effects of culture on the governance and regulation of a nation, using business law in the USA, Canada, India and China as case studies. She graduated with honors distinction in 2012. She then returned to Canada and began working as an articled clerk for the city of Mississauga.

Political career
In December 2014, Khalid won her nomination to be the Liberal Party of Canada’s candidate for the riding of Mississauga-Erin Mills. In the 2015 federal election Khalid defeated two-term Conservative MP Bob Dechert to win the riding. Khalid was one of two Pakistani-Canadian women elected to the House of Commons in the 2015 election, along with fellow Liberal Salma Zahid. She was re-elected in 2019 and again in 2021.

Khalid currently serves as Vice-Chair of the Standing Committee on Access to Information, Privacy, and Ethics (ETHI), as well as a member of the National Security and Intelligence Committee of Parliamentarians (NSICOP). She has previously served as chair on the Standing Committee of Justice and Human Rights and sat on the Foreign Affairs and International Development Subcommittee on International Human Rights (SDIR). In addition to these roles, she also served as Chair of the Liberal Women's Caucus and the All-Party Women's Caucus.

In 2018, Khalid sponsored petition E-1566, calling on the Prime Minister to appoint a Minister or special advisor on Seniors Affairs. Later that same year, the Government of Canada appointed Filomena Tassi as the Minister for Seniors.

Justice 
As a member of the Standing Committee of Justice and Human Rights, Khalid has been involved in debates and studies regarding topics such as Access to Justice, the Court Challenges Program, Physician Assisted Dying legislation, Transgender Rights legislation, Bestiality and Animal Fighting, Online Hate in Canada, Genetic Discrimination, and Elder Abuse.

In 2017, Khalid tabled a successful motion to undertake a study on human trafficking. After hearing from numerous witnesses and travelling across Canada to examine the issue further, the committee presented its report “Moving Forward in the Fight Against Human Trafficking in Canada”, which included recommendations that would help provide victims of trafficking the support they need and bring traffickers to justice.

Human Rights Work 
As a member of the Subcommittee for International Human Rights, Khalid took part in major studies on human rights situations around the word including human rights violations in Peru, Vietnam, Syria, Iraq, Burundi, Mauritania, China, Venezuela, and the issue of sex trafficking in South Asia. She has also travelled to Kenya and Ethiopia on studies of international development efforts worldwide.

In 2016 Khalid brought forward a successful motion to the Subcommittee for International Human Rights to study the Plight of the Rohingya minority in Myanmar.  The report produced by the study was debated in an emergency debate in the House of Commons and as a result Canada became one of the first countries to recognize the genocide of the Rohingya minority in Myanmar.

In 2017 Khalid sponsored petition E609, asking the Canadian government to assist the residents of Aleppo who were affected by the Syrian crisis.

In December 2016, MP Khalid introduced a private members motion asking the government to develop a strategy to tackle systemic racism and religious discrimination. The motion was developed in response to a petition condemning Islamophobia in Canada, which was sponsored by MP Frank Baylis. The motion passed with 2/3 majority approval and a study was commissioned by the Standing Committee on Canadian Heritage. The committee released a report in 2018, and as a result $23 million was marked to invest in anti-racism and anti-discrimination initiatives.

For her work on human rights, Khalid was named as one of Chatelaine's Women of the Year in 2017.

Electoral record

References

External links
 Official Website
 openparliament.ca Profile
 Iqra Khalid - Parliament of Canada Biography

1986 births
Living people
York University alumni
Western Michigan University Cooley Law School alumni
Liberal Party of Canada MPs
Members of the House of Commons of Canada from Ontario
Women members of the House of Commons of Canada
Women in Ontario politics
Canadian politicians of Punjabi descent
Canadian women legal professionals
People from Rahim Yar Khan District
Politicians from Mississauga
21st-century Canadian politicians
21st-century Canadian women politicians
Naturalized citizens of Canada